Philagraula is a genus of scoopwing moths in the family Uraniidae. There is one described species in Philagraula, P. slossoniae.

References

Further reading

External links

 

Uraniidae
Articles created by Qbugbot